Julius Leopold Korngold (24 December 1860 – 25 September 1945) was an Austrian music critic. He was the leading critic in early twentieth century Vienna, serving as chief music critic of the Neue Freie Presse from 1904 to 1934. His son was the composer Erich Wolfgang Korngold, whom he named after Wolfgang Amadeus Mozart, one of his favorite composers.

Life and career
He was the father of composer Erich Wolfgang Korngold. He co-wrote the libretto of the opera Die tote Stadt with his son (under the collective pseudonym Paul Schott). He died in Hollywood, California on 25 September 1945.

In his time, he was known as the "dean of European music critics". He is most notable for championing the works of Gustav Mahler at a time when many did not think much of him.

References

Sources

Further reading

External links
 
 

Austrian music critics
Austrian Jews
1860 births
1945 deaths
Austrian opera librettists